Cabuyao Mansion (formerly the Marcos Twin Mansion) is a government-owned mansion located at Brgy. Casile, Cabuyao. The mansion was built in the 1980s during the administration of the former Philippine president Ferdinand Marcos. It was then sequestered in 1987 as part of the  ill-gotten properties that were acquired by the Marcos family. In 2010, the Sandiganbayan ordered the return of the property to the Marcos Family.  However, in 2017 the Supreme Court of the Philippines has released a hold order on this, and the property is still currently under control of the Presidential Commission on Good Government.

The mansion is located west of Canlubang Golf & Country Club and north of Matang Tubig and northeast of People's Park in the Sky,  It is located near neighboring cities and towns of  Biñan, Sta. Rosa, Calamba, Silang, Cavite and Carmona, Cavite. In recent years, it has been the site of filming for several local horror and historical films and is often visited by cyclists who are traversing the Tagaytay-Calamba Road, or popularly known as "RevPal".

See also 
 Ferdinand Marcos
 Casile, Cabuyao
 Matang Tubig
 Canlubang Golf & Country Club
 Marcos mansions
 Unexplained wealth of the Marcos family

References 

Buildings and structures in Cabuyao
Tourist attractions in Laguna (province)